Brephos is a genus of moths of the family Noctuidae.

Species
 Brephos ansorgei Jordan, 1904
 Brephos decora Linnaeus, 1764
 Brephos festiva Jordan, 1913
 Brephos moldaenkei (Dewitz, 1881)
 Brephos nyassana Bartel, 1903
 Brephos staeleniana Kiriakoff, 1954
 Brephos sublaeta Kiriakoff, 1975

References
 Brephos at Markku Savela's Lepidoptera and Some Other Life Forms
 Natural History Museum Lepidoptera genus database

Agaristinae